Đào Duy Khánh (born 30 January 1994) is a Vietnamese footballer who plays as a Defender (association football) for V.League 1 club Hải Phòng.

Honours

Clubs

Hanoi
V.League 1
 Winners :       2016, 2018
 Runners-up :  2014, 2015
Vietnamese Super Cup
 Runners-up :  2015, 2016
Vietnamese National Cup
 Runners-up :  2015, 2016
AFC Cup    :
Quarter-finals 2014 AFC Cup

References 

1994 births
Living people
Vietnamese footballers
Association football central defenders
V.League 1 players
Hanoi FC players
Footballers at the 2014 Asian Games
People from Bắc Ninh province
Asian Games competitors for Vietnam